Dawn Addis is an American educator, activist, and politician serving as a member of the California State Assembly for the 30th district. Elected in November 2022, she assumed office on December 5, 2022.

Education 
Addis earned a Bachelor of Arts degree in art education and Spanish and a Master of Science in special education from San Francisco State University.

Career 
Addis worked as an educator in the San Luis Coastal Unified School District 20 years. In 2016, she founded the San Luis Obispo chapter of the Women's March. She served as a member of the Morro Bay City Council from 2019 to 2022 and as mayor pro tem from 2019 to 2021.

In 2018, Addis ran for the California State Assembly against incumbent Republican Jordan Cunningham in a district including all of San Luis Obispo County.  Although Addis was well-funded, Cunningham won by 55% to 45%.

In 2022, redistricting moved the district north and split San Luis Obispo County, leading Cunningham to retire.  Addis was elected to the California State Assembly in November 2022. She is a member of the Rules Committee.

References 

Living people
San Francisco State University alumni
People from Morro Bay, California
People from San Luis Obispo County, California
Democratic Party members of the California State Assembly
Women state legislators in California
Educators from California
Activists from California
Year of birth missing (living people)